The Japan Senior Open Golf Championship is one of the major championships in Japanese men's senior golf. It is administered by the Japan Golf Association (JGA) and is recognised as a major championship by the PGA of Japan Senior Tour. It was founded in 1991.

Winners
2022 Prayad Marksaeng (4)
2021 Taichi Teshima
2020 Akira Teranishi
2019 Toru Taniguchi
2018 Prayad Marksaeng (3)
2017 Prayad Marksaeng (2)
2016 Prayad Marksaeng
2015 Takenori Hiraishi
2014 Masahiro Kuramoto (2)
2013 Kiyoshi Murota (2)
2012 Frankie Miñoza
2011 Kiyoshi Murota
2010 Masahiro Kuramoto
2009 Tsukasa Watanabe
2008 Tsuneyuki Nakajima (3)
2007 Isao Aoki (5)
2006 Tsuneyuki Nakajima (2)
2005 Tsuneyuki Nakajima
2004 Katsunari Takahashi (3)
2003 Katsunari Takahashi (2)
2002 Takaaki Fukuzawa
2001 Fujio Kobayashi
2000 Katsunari Takahashi
1999 Graham Marsh (2)
1998 Graham Marsh
1997 Isao Aoki (4)
1996 Isao Aoki (3)
1995 Isao Aoki (2)
1994 Isao Aoki
1993 Seiichi Kanai (3)
1992 Seiichi Kanai (2)
1991 Seiichi Kanai

External links
Japan PGA home page 

Golf tournaments in Japan